Jalgaon Junction railway station serves Jalgaon in Jalgaon district in the Indian state of Maharashtra.

History

Electrification
The Jalgaon–Bhusawal section was electrified in 1968–69.

Amenities

Amenities at Jalgaon railway station include: computerized reservation office, subscriber trunk dialling/public call office booth, waiting room, retiring room, elevators, escalators, vegetarian and non-vegetarian refreshments, and a book stall.

Other
Buses and taxis are available at Jalgaon for visiting Ajanta.

References

External links
  Trains at Jalgaon
 

Railway junction stations in Maharashtra
Railway stations in Jalgaon district
Bhusawal railway division
Railway stations opened in 1860
Jalgaon